The RD-0124 (GRAU Index 14D23) is a rocket engine burning liquid oxygen and kerosene in a staged combustion cycle. RD-0124 engines are used on the Soyuz-2.1b and Soyuz-2-1v. A slight variation of the engine, the RD-0124A, is used on the Angara rocket family URM-2 upper stage. RD-0124 is developed by Chemical Automatics Design Bureau in Voronezh.

Design 
RD-0124 engines use a multi-stage turbopump powered by pre-combustion of the engine propellants in the preburner. The kerosene fuel is used for regenerative cooling of the engine. Vehicle attitude control during ascent is provided by gimbaling the engine in two planes. The propellant tanks are helium-pressurized. Four combustion chambers are fed by a single turbopump system. The engine operates at a high chamber pressure and, for the type of propellants used, achieves a very high specific impulse of nearly 360 seconds in vacuum – a specific impulse that can only be exceeded by hydrolox rockets like the RS-25, and by the next-generation methalox rockets like the Raptor engine.

History 
The inaugural flight of a launch vehicle using an RD-0124 engine took place on December 27, 2006. Orbital Sciences considered using the RD-0124 in the High Energy Second Stage (HESS) for their Antares rocket. It would have replaced the Castor 30B second stage.

Versions 
This upper stage engine has been adapted to two different launch vehicles, the Soyuz-2-1b/v and the Angara family. As such, there are different versions:

 RD-0124 (GRAU Index 14D23). It is the version for the Soyuz-2-1b and Soyuz-2-1v Blok-I. It is the first liquid rocket engine designed in Russia after the Soviet period.
 RD-0124A It is the version that powers the Angara URM-2, both the 1.2 and the bigger 5 versions.
 RD-0124DR Version developed between 2008 and 2013 for the Soyuz-2-3 project. The throttling capability meant a redesign of the preburner and the combustion chamber.
 RD-0125A Single nozzle version of the RD-0124A, it is planned as an upgrade for the Angara URM-2. It would enable the use of dual engines, which would enhance performance and reduce launch cost. Probably only planned for the Angara-5 URM-2, which is bigger than the Angara-1.2's.
RD-0124MS A new Russian rocket engine with a thrust of 60 tons (533 kN), powered by naphthyl–liquid oxygen propellants. The engine consists of two blocks located on a common frame and a heat shield. Each consists of two diagonally located combustion chambers. The engine provides steering of the chambers in two planes, as well as able to work when one of the blocks is turned off. In development as of 2020 to power second stage of Soyuz-5 rocket.

See also 
RD-0110 — previous engine.
Soyuz-2-1b — first launch vehicle to use it.
Soyuz-2-1v — second launch vehicle to use it.
Angara — third launch vehicle to use it.
Comparison of orbital rocket engines

References 

Rocket engines of Russia
Rocket engines using kerosene propellant
Rocket engines using the staged combustion cycle
KBKhA rocket engines